The 1993 New Zealand Labour Party leadership election was held to determine the leadership of the New Zealand Labour Party. The leadership was won by  MP Helen Clark, who had been Deputy Leader of the party since 1989.

Background 
After their heavy defeat in 1990, enough right-wingers (supporters of Rogernomics) held their seats for Mike Moore to remain as leader. Despite a major swing back towards Labour at the November 1993 election, the party did not regain office. Despite the closeness of the margin it was Moore's second consecutive loss as leader, leading many to question his position.

Candidates

Helen Clark 
Clark had been Deputy Leader since 1989, first under Geoffrey Palmer, then under Moore. Since 1990 she had been Shadow Minister of Health and Labour. Clark had gained unrivalled influence over the wider Labour Party, but not the parliamentary caucus. In the run up to 1993, Clark and her allies (including former presidents Margaret Wilson and Ruth Dyson) who sat on the candidate selection panel had strategically installed likeminded candidates in nearly all winnable seats. Clark urged them to campaign alongside Moore but be primed to vote against him in the event of any post-election face-off. Clark was particularly critical of Moore for delivering blurred messages during the 1993 campaign and accused him of failing to re-brand Labour as a centre-left party which had jettisoned Rogernomics.

Mike Moore 
Moore had served as Labour's leader since 1990. In 1993, by vigorously campaigning Moore managed to lead Labour to within two seats of snatching an unlikely victory over National only one term after their rout in 1990. However, Moore was disliked in large sections of the party, particularly among women. He was, unlike Clark, also closely linked with Labour's Rogernomics policies of the 1980s which helped fuel the growth of the Alliance party made up largely of Labour dissidents who were largely credited with splitting the vote enough to lose Labour the cliffhanger 1993 election. New party president Maryan Street asked Moore to step down voluntarily, but he refused forcing an open challenge.

Result
A caucus vote was held on 1 December 1993 where a leadership ballot was moved by David Lange and (to the surprise of most) seconded by Moore. It was passed unanimously and chief whip Jonathan Hunt called for all those seeking the leadership to stand. Moore stood up, followed by Clark who won by seven votes. Now leaving the Deputy-leadership open, David Caygill stood and was elected 23 to 21 over Michael Cullen.

Leadership ballot

Deputy-leadership ballot

How each MP voted
A list of each MP's vote.

Aftermath 

Clark would lead Labour until she resigned in 2008. She went on to lose the next election in 1996, but would then win three consecutively (a record for a Labour leader) in 1999, 2002 and 2005. Moore did not take the loss gracefully and was a constant agitator in Labour's ranks until his retirement in 1999. During that time he was Labour's spokesman on Foreign Affairs and Trade.

A noted critic of Clark's ousting of Moore as Labour leader was former Labour Prime Minister Norman Kirk's widow Ruth, who famously rang a Christchurch talkback radio show in 1993 to voice her fury at the episode. Damien O'Connor (a new MP in 1993) said in 2018 that his decision to support Moore over Clark would set his career back a decade, saying that he was the only one of Labour's 14 newly elected MPs to vote for Moore.

Notes

References
 
 

Labour Party leadership
1993
December 1993 events in New Zealand
Indirect elections
Helen Clark
New Zealand Labour Party leadership election